"Mad World" is a song by Dutch DJ and music producer Hardwell. It features Dutch singer and songwriter Jake Reese.

Background 
The song was premiered by Hardwell at Ultra Music Festival. It is the 200th release of Hardwell's label Revealed Recordings. A contest was set up for fans to remix the song. An official music video was released on 16 October 2015. The song was featured on Hardwell's United We Are remix album.

Track listing

Charts

References 

2015 songs
2015 singles
Hardwell songs